In algebraic geometry, especially in scheme theory, a property is said to hold geometrically over a field if it also holds over the algebraic closure of the field. In other words, a property holds geometrically if it holds after a base change to a geometric point. For example, a smooth variety is a variety that is geometrically regular.

Geometrically irreducible and geometrically reduced 
Given a scheme X that is of finite type over a field k, the following are equivalent:
X is geometrically irreducible; i.e.,  is irreducible, where  denotes an algebraic closure of k.
 is irreducible for a separable closure  of k.
 is irreducible for each field extension F of k.

The same statement also holds if "irreducible" is replaced with "reduced" and the separable closure is replaced by the perfect closure.

References

Sources

Scheme theory